Gates Homestead is a historic home located at Bolton, Warren County, New York.  The property includes the main house, ice house, carpenter shop, and two barns.  All structures (except the east barn) were built between about 1830 and 1880 and moved to their present location in 1919. The main house was built about 1830 and is a -story, post and beam, five-by-two-bay late Federal / early-Greek Revival–style residence.

It was added to the National Register of Historic Places in 2010.

References

Houses on the National Register of Historic Places in New York (state)
Houses completed in 1830
Houses in Warren County, New York
1830 establishments in New York (state)
National Register of Historic Places in Warren County, New York